Jefferson Township is the name of 7 townships in the U.S. state of Oklahoma:

 Jefferson Township, Caddo County, Oklahoma
 Jefferson Township, Coal County, Oklahoma
 Jefferson Township, Cotton County, Oklahoma
 Jefferson Township, Ellis County, Oklahoma
 Jefferson Township, Washington County, Oklahoma
 Jefferson Township, Woods County, Oklahoma
 Jefferson Township, Woodward County, Oklahoma

See also 
 Jefferson Township (disambiguation)

Oklahoma township disambiguation pages